Jaidyn Stephenson (born 15 January 1999) is a professional Australian rules footballer playing for the North Melbourne Football Club in the Australian Football League (AFL), having been initially drafted to the Collingwood Football Club.

AFL career
He was drafted by Collingwood with their first selection and sixth overall in the 2017 national draft. His performance in the 48-point win against  in round four of the 2018 season—in which he recorded thirteen disposals, five goals, four marks and three tackles—earned him the round nomination for the AFL Rising Star. Stephenson would go on to win the 2018 AFL Rising Star after a successful first season in which he kicked 38 goals, marking Collingwood's first win in that award category. That same season Stephenson played in the 2018 AFL Grand Final kicking two goals in the first quarter, however Collingwood Football Club would ultimately lose by 5 points to the West Coast Eagles.

At the end of the 2020 AFL season, he was put up for trade by Collingwood to alleviate their salary cap, and was traded to North Melbourne on the final day of trade period.

Stephenson who was moved to the midfield in his first season with North Melbourne in the 2021 AFL season was named to the 22under22 for the second and final time.

Controversies
In 2019, Stephenson was suspended for the final 10 games of the home and away season, following revelations that he placed bets on Collingwood games. There was also a $20,000 fine imposed.

In July 2021, Stephenson had a career high 38 disposals in a Round 17 win against the West Coast Eagles. Days later, he faced strong criticism for sharing his views that Covid-19 had been overblown by the media, and questioning vaccinations.

In August 2021, Stephenson again came under fire by the media after being hospitalized from an accident on a mountain bike while drunk, which resulted in him fracturing his hip.

Personal life
As of May 2021, Stephenson was studying for a Bachelor of Commerce at Deakin University.

Stephenson attended St Joseph’s College, Ferntree Gully.

Statistics
Statistics are correct to finals week 3 2021

|- style="background-color: #eaeaea"
! scope="row" style="text-align:center" | 2018
|
| 35 || 26 || 38 || 24 || 205 || 115 || 320 || 101 || 75 || 1.5 || 0.9 || 7.9 || 4.4 || 12.3 || 3.9 || 2.9
|-
! scope="row" style="text-align:center" | 2019
|
| 1 || 14 || 24 || 13 || 158 || 61 || 219 || 93 || 29 || 1.7 || 0.9 || 11.3 || 4.4 || 15.6 || 6.6 || 2.1
|- style="background-color: #eaeaea"
! scope="row" style="text-align:center" | 2020
|
| 1 || 14 || 14 || 10 || 85 || 47 || 132 || 47 || 25 || 1.0 || 0.7 || 6.1 || 3.4 || 9.4 || 3.4 || 1.8
|-
! scope="row" style="text-align:center" | 2021
| 
| 2 || 19 || 17 || 19 || 249 || 119 || 368 || 109 || 48 || 0.9 || 1.0 || 13.1 || 6.2|| 19.4 || 5.7 || 2.6
|- class="sortbottom"
! colspan=3| Career
! 62
! 86
! 56
! 553
! 272
! 825
! 284
! 150
! 1.3
! 0.9
! 8.9
! 4.3
! 13.3
! 4.5
! 2.4
|}

References

External links

1999 births
Living people
Collingwood Football Club players
Eastern Ranges players
Australian rules footballers from Victoria (Australia)
AFL Rising Star winners
North Melbourne Football Club players